Ernst Anton Plischke (1903 – 23 May 1992) was an Austrian-New Zealand modernist architect, town planner and furniture designer whose work is well known throughout Europe and New Zealand.

Early years
Plischke was born in the town of Klosterneuburg near Vienna (Austria) in 1903. His father worked as an architect and his mother came from a family of cabinet-makers. From an early age he spent time in workshops and studios, before studying interior- and furniture-design at Vienna's College of Arts and Crafts.

At the age of twenty, influenced by his father to become an architect, he was accepted into a Master School run by leading architect Peter Behrens. His architecture as a student reflected the dynamic and repetitious nature of the early modernist style.

After graduating from the academy in 1926, Plischke worked in Peter Behrens's private office, and in 1929 travelled to New York to work, but the start of the Great Depression in 1929 ruined this opportunity.

In 1930 the Austrian government commissioned Plischke to build the Labour Exchange building in Liesing. Completion of this in 1931 made him one of Austria's leading architects.

One of the Plischke's early houses, the Gamerith House at Attersee, foreshadows his later work in New Zealand. The house fits into the surrounding landscape and has a boat-like quality.

In 1935 he married Anna Lang-Schwizer and received the Austrian State Prize for architecture.

In March 1938 Germany occupied Austria. German law required that all architects had to become part of a centralised Reich Chamber of Culture. Because his wife was Jewish, he was not accepted into the Chamber of Arts. This, along with the banning of modernist buildings by the German occupation, led Plischke to move to New Zealand in 1939.

New Zealand architect

When Plischke arrived in New Zealand in 1939 with his wife Anna, he was already known in architectural circles to be at the forefront of modernist design. He began working for the Ministry of Housing on projects such as the Dixon Street Flats. In 1942, he designed the Abel Tasman Monument for a site in Golden Bay for the tercentenary of Abel Tasman's visit to New Zealand. From 1943–47 he worked for the Department of Town Planning producing work in areas including: Naenae, Trentham, Tāmaki and Mangakino. He also completed private work during this time, including the Frankel House in Christchurch (for Otto Frankel), which was his first commission. Frankel House is a Category 2 entry on the Heritage New Zealand register.

Plischke and his family struggled to integrate into New Zealand society, due to prejudices against their nationality at the time. Plischke found it harder to be accepted by New Zealand architects. He felt he was already a fully qualified architect and internationally renowned, and so wasn't prepared to take examinations to become a registered architect with the New Zealand Institute of Architects.

In 1947, the Government of New Zealand gave a desk made to a design by Plischke as their official wedding gift to Princess Elizabeth.

In 1947, he unsuccessfully applied to be chair of design at the School of Architecture at Auckland University College. As an unregistered architect he then sought out a partnership with a registered architect. In 1948 he formed the 'Plishke & Firth' partnership with Cedric Firth. Massey House (1951–1957) located on Lambton Quay was their biggest project, with Plischke designing the concept due to Firth being abroad. The partnership ended in 1959 and Plischke joined Robert Fantl in another partnership, but with work drying up in the early 1960s Plischke accepted an academic role back in Vienna, Austria.

Back to Vienna
Leaving behind his adopted country, in 1963 Plischke took up the role of Professor of Architecture at the Academy of Fine Arts in Vienna. Teaching and writing took up much of his time during the last decades of his life. A couple of significant books he wrote were Vom Menschlichen im neuen Bauen (‘On the human aspect in modern architecture’) and a Biography; Ernst A. Plischke; Ein Leben mit Architektur. Austria also rewarded him with a number of awards; Austrian Cross of Honor for Science and the Arts, First Class (1973) and the Golden Medal of Honor for Science and the Arts (1988). He was made Honorary Member of the Academy of Fine Arts Vienna (1983), Honorary Member of the American Institute of Architects (1987) and Honorary Member of the Austrian Society for Architecture (1988).

Plischke died aged 89, in Vienna on 23 May 1992.

References

1903 births
1992 deaths
People from Klosterneuburg
Austrian architects
Austrian emigrants to New Zealand
Modernist architects
Austrian urban planners
New Zealand urban planners
Austrian furniture designers
Academic staff of the Academy of Fine Arts Vienna
20th-century New Zealand architects